"Pure Cocaine" is a song by American rapper Lil Baby from his mixtape Street Gossip. It was produced by Quay Global and Mattazik Muzik.

Critical reception
Marcus Blackwell of HipHopDX praised the song in his review of Street Gossip, writing, "As an artist, Lil Baby is at the peak of his powers on the standout record 'Pure Cocaine,' where his rapid-fire flows and melodic delivery highlight his skillset the most. where his rapid-fire flows and melodic delivery highlight his skillset the most."

Music video
The official music video was released on March 8, 2019 and directed by Edgar Esteves. In it, Lil Baby abandons an old life of hustling, and severs ties with the kingpin as he gives him the rest of his dirty money. In the next scene, Baby enjoys his new success as a rapper, throwing a party in his mansion. He and the others are all dressed in white and the insides of the mansion are white as well, as a reference to cocaine. Lil Baby is surrounded by his crew and a bunch of women and is seen rapping in front of a pool, while exotic dancers appear around him performing tricks. The party ends when the kingpin suddenly arrives; an argument ensues and guns are soon drawn toward Baby as the video ends.

Charts

Certifications

References

2018 songs
Lil Baby songs
Song recordings produced by Quay Global
Songs written by Lil Baby
Songs written by Quay Global